Desisopsis is a genus of longhorn beetles of the subfamily Lamiinae, containing the following species:

 Desisopsis maculata Hüdepohl, 1995
 Desisopsis magallanesorum Vives, 2013
 Desisopsis lanlayroni

References

Pteropliini